Carlos Tan (born November 4, 1893) was a Filipino politician who served as Senator in the 1st Congress of the Philippines.

Personal life 
Carlos Tan was born in Ormoc, Leyte to Pablo Tan and Rosalia Salvatierra de Fan.

Tan attended Colegio de San Carlos, Colegio de San Juan de Letran, Manila High School and the University of the Philippines. He is a holder of the degree of Bachelor of Arts, Bachelor of Laws and was admitted to the bar in 1915.

He was married to Isabel Mirasol of Jaro, Iloilo City.

Public service 
He was elected as municipal councilor of Ormoc, Leyte and later became a representative to the Philippine Legislature from 1928 to 1935. In November 1938, he was elected representative for the same district from 1938 to 1941.

References 

1893 births
1970 deaths
Colegio de San Juan de Letran alumni
Liberal Party (Philippines) politicians
Members of the House of Representatives of the Philippines from Leyte (province)
People from Ormoc
Senators of the 1st Congress of the Philippines
University of the Philippines Diliman alumni